The Cabinet of Ministers of Turkmenistan is the chief executive body in Turkmenistan.
The Cabinet of Ministers of Turkmenistan is appointed by the President of Turkmenistan who is both the chief of state and head of government.  In addition to holding specific portfolios in most cases, six deputy chairpersons (but colloquially also called ) of the Cabinet of Ministers may also be assigned responsibility for oversight of a province of Turkmenistan or of the capital city.

The head of one state corporation ("state concern"), Türkmengaz, also holds ministerial rank, and is styled "minister of state".

Current Members of the Cabinet of Ministers 

The position of deputy chairman for security, military, and justice issues was abolished 6 April 2022 by presidential decree. 
By decree of 8 July 2020, oversight of Balkan province was assigned to a non-member of the Cabinet of Ministers, General Director of the Transport and Communications Agency Mämmethan Çakyýew. Ministry of Sports and Youth Policy was downgraded to a state committee by presidential decree on 20 October 2022.

References 

 
1991 establishments in Turkmenistan